Beriah may refer to:
Beriah (biblical figure), several biblical figures
Beri'ah, a spiritual world in Kabbalah